Kauz is a German surname meaning screech owl. Notable people with the surname include:

Herman Kauz (born 1928), American martial arts teacher
Jürgen Kauz (born 1974), Austrian footballer

See also
KAUZ

Surnames from nicknames